Boris Yurevich Grachevsky (Russian: Борис Юрьевич Грачевский)  (18 March 1949 – 14 January 2021) was a Russian film director, screenwriter, and actor. His family was of Jewish descent. He was artistic director of the children's TV show and magazine Yeralash.

He died of COVID-19 during the COVID-19 pandemic in Russia.

Awards and honors 
 Order of Honour (2009)
Order of Friendship (2019)
Honored Artist of the Russian Federation

References

External links
 

1949 births
2021 deaths
Russian film producers
Soviet film producers
Soviet film directors
Russian film directors
Soviet screenwriters
20th-century Russian screenwriters
Male screenwriters
20th-century Russian male writers
Soviet actors
Soviet male actors
Russian actors
Russian male actors
Russian Jews
Jewish Russian actors
20th-century Russian male actors
21st-century Russian male actors
Soviet male voice actors
Russian male voice actors
Recipients of the Order of Honour (Russia)
Gerasimov Institute of Cinematography alumni
Russian documentary filmmakers
Russian atheists
Burials in Troyekurovskoye Cemetery
Deaths from the COVID-19 pandemic in Russia